The 2012 UNAF U-20 Tournament (2) is the 7th edition of the UNAF U-20 Tournament and the 2nd edition on 2012. The tournament took place in Blida and Zéralda (Algiers), from 8 to 13 December

Participants
  A & B (hosts)
 
 
  (invited)
 

Algeria B replaced Benin which withdrew a few days before starting competition.

Group stage

Group A

Group B

Knockout stage
Normally the final oppose the winners of the two groups, Algeria A and Egypt, however the match was canceled because the two teams are rivals in the next 2013 African U-20 Championship.
A new poster was therefore put in place which will see Algeria A face Morocco, as part of a classification game to determine which team will take over second place.
Egypt, for its part, is declared the winner of the tournament with his two victories.

Second place match

Algeria A finished second with his first place in group A of the group stage.

Final

Champion

Scorers
3 goals
 Bilal Ouali
 Kahraba

References

2012 in African football
U20
UNAF U-20 Tournament
UNAF U-20 Tournament